New jack swing, new jack, or swingbeat is a fusion genre of the rhythms and production techniques of hip hop and dance-pop, and the urban contemporary sound of R&B. Spearheaded by producers Teddy Riley and Bernard Belle, new jack swing was most popular from the late 1980s to early 1990s.

Merriam-Webster's online dictionary defines new jack swing as "pop music usually performed by black musicians that combines elements of jazz, funk, rap, and rhythm and blues." New jack swing took up the trend of using sampled beats and tunes, and created beats using electronic drum machines such as the then-new SP-1200 sampler and the Roland TR-808 to lay an "insistent beat under light melody lines and clearly enunciated vocals." The Roland TR-808 was sampled to create distinctive, syncopated, swung rhythms, with its snare sound being especially prominent.

History

Kyle West remembered 1985 as the year he listened to new jack swing with Teddy Riley. Riley as well as drummer Lenny White credit the start of new jack swing to English singer-songwriter and producer Junior Giscombe and his 1985 single "Oh Louise". Some music critics said Full Force's "Alice, I Want You Just for Me" (1985) was the first new jack swing song, and Jimmy Jam and Terry Lewis called Full Force and said Alice was their favorite song, and their favorite group was Full Force. After that, Jam & Lewis produced Janet Jackson's digital R&B album, Control (1986).  Musicologist Richard J. Ripani PhD, author of The New Blue Music: Changes in Rhythm & Blues, 1950–1999 (2006), observed that the album was one of the first successful records to influence the rise of new jack swing by creating a fusion of R&B, rap, funk, disco and synthesized percussion. The new jack swing sound is particularly evident in the second single, "Nasty". The success of Control, according to Ripani, bridged the gap between R&B and rap music. He asserts that "since Jackson's album was released in 1986 and was hugely successful, it is not unreasonable to assume that it had at least some impact on the new jack swing creations of Teddy Riley." Mantronix's early records in the mid-1980s also had new jack elements.

The term "new jack swing" was coined in an October 18, 1987 Village Voice profile of Teddy Riley by Barry Michael Cooper. "New Jack" was a slang term (meaning ~'Johnny-come-lately') used in a song by Grandmaster Caz of the Cold Crush Brothers, and "swing" was intended by Cooper to draw an "analogy between the music played at the speakeasies of F. Scott Fitzgerald's time to the crackhouses of Teddy Riley's time."

The term "new jack swing" describes the sound produced and engineered by R&B/hip hop artist and producer Teddy Riley. Riley is an American R&B and hip hop singer-songwriter, musician and record producer. He led the band Guy in the late 1980s and Blackstreet in the 1990s. Riley said, "I define the term [new jack swing] as a new kid on the block who's swinging it." The defining feature of Riley's music was the introduction of swingbeats, "a rhythmic pattern using offbeat accented 16th note triplets." In an interview with Revolt TV in 2017, Andre Harrell called Riley the inventor of the sound, hailing him "the king of New Jack Swing, because he invented it."

Music website VH1.com notes that while in the 2000s "hip-hop and R&B are kissing cousins", in the early 1980s, "the two genres were seldom mentioned in the same breath." However, in the late 1980s, "during the era of high-top fades, and parachute pants, producer Teddy Riley and label boss Andre Harrell successfully fused and marketed the two sounds in a sexy, exclamatory music that critics termed new jack swing. It sparked a revolution." Riley stated that before new jack swing, "Rappers and singers didn't want anything to do with one another", because "Singers were soft, rappers were street." Riley's new style blended "sweet melody and big beats." The sensibilities of Riley's fusion of the styles would forever change pop music/hip-hop music pairing and was further popularized with Bad Boy's dominance of the late '90s through much of the same techniques. Riley, a 19-year-old man from Harlem, quickly became an A-list producer and commanded big fees to add his sound to major artist projects.

Influences
The 1989 film Ghostbusters II helped spread new jack swing with its theme song, "On Our Own" by Bobby Brown (written by L.A. Reid, Babyface and Daryl Simmons), who was along with Riley nicknamed "The King of New Jack Swing". NBC sitcom The Fresh Prince of Bel-Air also boosted the spread of this culture, as the star of the show, Will Smith, was known initially for his hip-hop duo with DJ Jazzy Jeff. During the first episode of the series, Will Smith dances to the Soul II Soul new jack swing single "Back to Life (However Do You Want Me)". In other episodes, he sings "Teddy's Jam" and "Rump Shaker". A Different World, Waynehead and In Living Color are other television programs of the era which exhibit influences from the new jack swing style. Video Soul, Soul Train, Showtime at the Apollo as well as the late night talk show The Arsenio Hall Show also helped to promote these acts.

House Party with Kid 'n Play, Boyz n the Hood, Juice, New Jack City, Boomerang, Above the Rim, Poetic Justice, used New Jack Swing songs in their soundtracks. Dance-oriented artists such as Michael Jackson, the Good Girls, Jane Child, Tammy Lucus, Abstrac, Nayobe, Paula Abdul and Bell Biv DeVoe also have new jack swing elements in their late 1980s and early 1990s output.

To date the most successful new jack swing album is Dangerous, released in 1991 by Michael Jackson, produced by Jackson and Riley, which has sold over 30 million copies worldwide.

Golden age

Many songs with elements of new jack swing ranked in the top 10 of the US R&B and US "Hot 100" charts Billboard throughout the late 1980s and early 1990s. It is given the years of 1986 through 1992 as the height of its popularity with it reaching its peak in 1989.

In 1987, Keith Sweat's first new jack swing song "I Want Her" was number 5 on the US charts. It is considered the first official New Jack Swing hit. A few months later, Bobby Brown’s “My Prerogative” would take the genre even further.

The musician and record producer Teddy Riley's group Guy, a group which was one of the early pioneers of hip-hop and R&B had a hit with the song "Groove Me", which went to number 4 in the US R&B charts, and the 1988 song "Teddy's Jam", which ranked number 5 in the US R&B charts. Single "My Fantasy" was from the OST Do the Right Thing. "New Jack City" was on the soundtrack for the film of the same title. Johnny Kemp's "Just Got Paid" also cracked the top 10 on the Billboard Hot 100 in 1988 and went to number 1 on the Hot Dance Music/Club Play. The musician and Al B. Sure! had success with "Nite and Day" and other two singles went to the Top 5 of the R&B chart in 1988.

In 1988, Bobby Brown began his string of Top 10 Billboard hits from his second album, Don't Be Cruel, which ranked number 1 in the US. In that same year, Paula Abdul had the US number 1 hit "Straight Up". Tony! Toni! Toné! had three songs in the top ten of the Hot R&B/Hip-Hop Singles & Tracks, including "Little Walter" which hit number 1. New Edition after being in a transition due to the departure of Bobby Brown recruited Johnny Gill as his placement, leading to the release of the Jimmy Jam and Terry Lewis produced album Heart Break, which spun off five hit singles "If It Isn't Love", "You're Not My Kind of Girl", "Can You Stand the Rain", "Crucial", and "N.E. Heartbreak".

In 1988, Wreckx-n-Effect, a Teddy Riley-produced group which garnered press attention regarding their use of bikini-clad women in their videos, released "New Jack Swing", helping to popularize the new name for the emerging style. That same year, Fenderella garnered a hit with "Mr. DJ", a song with featured Doug E. Fresh, who was known as the "human beatbox" for his realistic imitations of drum machines and other hip-hop sounds.

Jimmy Jam and Terry Lewis produced seven top 5 singles off Janet Jackson's 1989 Rhythm Nation 1814 album, which merged the Minneapolis sound with new jack swing. The album included a number of successful tracks, such as the number one Billboard Hot 100 hits "Miss You Much". Karyn White, also produced by the Flyte Time team also had hits in the late 1980s and early '90s. Sheena Easton also had a few hits from her 1991 album What Comes Naturally produced by hitmaker Vassel Benford. Other notable new jack swing artists between 1988 and 1993 included Big Daddy Kane's "I Get The Job Done" and Kool Moe Dee's "I Go To Work", Heavy D. & the Boyz, Teddy Riley and Tammy Lucus, Deja, Abstrac, Nayobe, The Good Girls, Starpoint, Father MC, the Winans, Omar Chandler, James Ingram, Jane Child, Boy George, Kashif, Johnny Gill, Cristopher Williams and Ready for the World. Producer Babyface had a hit with his song "It's No Crime", which ranked number 7 in the US charts and number 1 on the US R&B charts. Another Teddy Riley-produced group, Today, had a hit with "Girl I Got My Eyes on You", which garnered a number 1 spot on the US R&B charts.

After the band New Edition broke up, its former members formed several splinter groups or acts, including Bell Biv DeVoe, Johnny Gill, Ralph Tresvant, and Bobby Brown. In 1990, several ex-New Edition members had hit songs. Bell Biv DeVoe's songs "Poison" and "Do Me!", as well as Johnny Gill's single "Rub You the Right Way", all made it to number 3 in the US top 100. Ralph Tresvant had a number 4 hit (US top 100 charts) and number 1 hit (US R&B) with his song "Sensitivity", with another on the House Party 2 soundtrack "Yo Baby Yo". Also in 1990 pop singer Whitney Houston recorded "I'm Your Baby Tonight", produced by Babyface & Antonio "L.A." Reid (later become record executive). The single topped the US Hot 100, giving Babyface his first produced number 1 song while further helping to bring the genre to the mainstream.

In 1990, Samuelle, a former member of the disco-infused dance-urban group Club Nouveau had a number 1 R&B hit with "So You Like What You See". Troop also had a number 1 hit with a single from their second album, Attitude, entitled "Spread My Wings". "Feels Good" by the Oakland, California group Tony! Toni! Toné! reached number 1 on the R&B charts in 1990, and it also placed on the US top 100 (number 9) and on the dance charts (number 3). Today charted again in 1990 with "Why You Gettin' Funky on Me?", which reached number 2 on the R&B charts. "Let's Chill" by Guy garnered a number 3 spot on the US R&B charts.

"Feels Like Another One" is a 1991 single co-written and recorded by singer Patti LaBelle off her album, Burnin. The new jack swing-styled track was the leading track for LaBelle's eleventh solo album and featured a rap from rapper Big Daddy Kane. The track became successful on the R&B chart as it ended up peaking at number three on the Hot R&B Singles chart. The video for the song was shot at the Apollo Theater and also featured Kane, who appeared at LaBelle's show wearing a tux. The song would help LaBelle's album go gold. Color Me Badd had a number 1 hit with "I Wanna Sex You Up". That same year, Christopher Williams released a single "I'm Dreamin'" from the New Jack City soundtrack, which became a number 1 single on Billboard′s Hot R&B/Hip-Hop chart. Boyz II Men's debut single "Motownphilly" was a number 1 R&B and top 5 U.S. pop hit. "I Like the Way (The Kissing Game)" by Hi-Five garnered the US number 1 and R&B number 1 spots. Jodeci's debut album Forever My Lady garnered three number 1 R&B Hits in the fall of 1991 ("Forever My Lady", "Stay", and "Come and Talk To Me").
"Exclusivity" by Damian Dame charted as number-one R&B single, spending two weeks at the top position, a position also achieved by the Rude Boys with their song "Are You Lonely For Me".

In 1992, Michael Jackson's single "Remember the Time" placed at number 3 on the Billboard Hot 100, number 2 on the Hot Dance Music/Club, and number 1 in the Hot R&B/Hip-Hop category. Joe Public's single "Live and Learn" hit number 4 on the U.S. Billboard Hot 100, number 3 on Billboard′s Hot R&B/Hip-Hop chart and becoming the group's most successful single. In 1993 Teddy Riley's new group Blackstreet got new jack swing hit "Baby Be Mine". Chuckii Booker scored a number 1 R&B hit with his song "Games". That same year, "She's Got That Vibe" by R. Kelly and Public Announcement reached the number 7 position on the R&B charts. "Weak" by SWV (Sisters With Voices) hit the number one spot on both the US top 100 and the R&B charts. In 1993: "Don't Walk Away" by Jade made it to number 4 and number 3 in the US top 100 and R&B charts, respectively. The New Jack R&B group II D Extreme scored a hit in 1993 with their New Jack ballad "Cry No More". TLC's debut album, Ooooooohhh... On the TLC Tip (1992) had several hits, including "What About Your Friends", "Ain't 2 Proud 2 Beg" and "Baby-Baby-Baby".

In 1995, Montell Jordan had a number one new jack swing hit, in "This is How We Do It", which after its release saw the popularity of the genre decline. As hip hop culture became increasingly ubiquitous, the pop-crossover approach and perceived artifice of new jack swing began to lose its appeal with young urban listeners. Even the creator of the New Jack Swing, Teddy Riley, made his sound evolve with his second supergroup BLACKStreet, with their 1994’s eponymous first album. A sound he sometimes called “Heavy R&B” in interviews.

The last hit single to use the classic new jack swing sound was Michael Jackson's "Blood on the Dance Floor", released in 1997.

Incorporation into pop music
Australian pop singer Kylie Minogue incorporated a strong new jack swing sound into her 1991 album Let's Get to It, most notably the lead single "Word Is Out". The album and singles achieved notable success in the UK, Australia and throughout Europe.

Mexican pop singer Paulina Rubio also incorporated a strong new jack swing system into her debut 1992 album La Chica Dorada and second album 24 Kilates and most notably her lead single "Mío" and third single "Amor de Mujer" which peaked at number 8 on the US Billboard Hot Latin Tracks.

Artists

See also
 List of funk musicians

References

External links

 
1980s in American music
1990s in American music
African-American cultural history
African-American music
African-American culture
American hip hop genres
Contemporary R&B